Atherstone  is a market town and civil parish in the North Warwickshire district of Warwickshire, England. Located in the far north of the county, Atherstone is on the A5 national route, and is adjacent to the border with Leicestershire which is here formed by the River Anker. It is only  from Staffordshire. It lies between the larger towns of Tamworth and Nuneaton. Atherstone is the administrative centre of the North Warwickshire district, with the offices of North Warwickshire Borough Council located in the town. 

Atherstone is probably most well known for its tradition of holding an annual Shrove Tuesday Ball Game in the streets, which has been played almost continuously since the Middle Ages.

In the 2021 census the population of the civil parish of Atherstone was at 9,212. The population of the larger built-up area which includes the adjoining village of Mancetter was 11,259.

History
Atherstone has a long history dating back to Roman times: The Roman road, the Watling Street (most of which later became part of the A5) ran through what is now Atherstone, and an important defended Roman settlement named Manduessedum existed at Mancetter near the site of modern-day Atherstone. It is widely believed that the forces of the rebel Queen Boudica were defeated in their final battle against the Romans at a location near Manduessedum in around AD 60. This was suggested as the most likely location of the battle by among others, the eminent archaeologist Graham Webster, although no firm evidence has emerged to confirm this to be the case.

The Domesday Book of 1086, records that Atherstone  (then named Aderestone) was held by Countess Godiva. After the Norman Conquest, the manor of Atherstone was given to Hugh Lupus, Earl of Chester who bestowed it to the monks of Bec Abbey of Normandy. In 1246 the monks of the Abbey obtained a charter from Henry III to hold a weekly market at Atherstone, thus transforming the settlement into a market town. In the 14th century, the town flourished, and Ralph Basset founded a house of Augustinian friars here in 1375, although this never became very important.

The ancient St Mary's Church in Atherstone dates from the early 12th century. The chapel was granted to Henry Cartwright in 1542, then left abandoned and neglected until 1692 when Samuel Bracebridge settled a yearly sum for the parson of Mancetter to preach there every other Sunday in the winter season. After this, St. Mary's Chapel seems to have experienced something of a revival. Its square tower being rebuilt in the fashionable "Gothic" style in 1782, and then was further redesigned in 1849 by Thomas Henry Wyatt and David Brandon.

On 21 August 1485, Henry Tudor, and up to 11,000 troops stayed at Atherstone the day before the Battle of Bosworth. Tudor was said to have stayed at the Three Tuns Inn in Long Street, while his troops camped in a meadow north of the parish church. Reputedly, whilst in Atherstone, Tudor secretly met with the powerful noblemen Thomas Stanley and his brother William Stanley who pledged their support for Tudor, which would prove decisive in the subsequent battle. A theory exists, that the battle actually took place in the fields of Merevale above Atherstone, although this is not widely accepted. The main argument put in favour of this theory, is that financial reparations were made to Atherstone after the battle and not to Market Bosworth.

In Tudor times, Atherstone was a thriving commercial centre for weaving and clothmaking. The town's favourable location laid out as a long ‘ribbon development’ along Watling Street, ensured its growth as a market town. While it remained an agricultural settlement in medieval times, attempts were made to encourage merchants and traders through the creation of burgage plots, a type of land tenure that provided them with special privileges. A manuscript discovered by Marjorie Morgan among the muniments of Cambridge's King's College (Ms. C9), refers to the creation of nine new burgage strips from land belonging to seven of the tenants in Atherstone vill.

By the late Tudor period Atherstone had become a centre for leatherworking, clothmaking, metalworking and brewing. Local sheep farmers and cattle graziers supplied wool and leather to local tanners and shoemakers (an industry that continued until the 1970s), while metalworkers, locksmiths and nailers fired their furnaces with local coal and the alemakers supplied thirsty palates on market days.

The surviving inventories from 16th century Mancetter provide a fascinating glimpse into Atherstone's Elizabethan merchants and traders, before the town was economically overshadowed by the bustling cities of Coventry and Birmingham. They show Atherstone at this time as a typical Midlands market town, taking full advantage of its location and agricultural setting. 

The argument that Altherstone declined in favour of emerging cities in the 18th century has been challenged. In the 1750s, Altherstone was very much still a vibrant settlement, possessing both a book club and a bowling-green. It was regularly frequented by the leisure-seeking gentry, including Sir Roger Newdigate and his circle of friends.

The Coventry Canal reached Atherstone in 1769, and the railways arrived in 1847, with the opening of the Trent Valley Railway, upon which Atherstone has its station.

Atherstone was once an important hatting town, and became well known for its felt hats. The industry began in the 17th century and at its height in the early 20th century there were seven firms employing 3,000 people. Due to cheap imports and a decline in the wearing of hats, the trade had largely died out by the 1970s with just three companies remaining, Denham & Hargrave Ltd, Vero & Everitt Ltd and Wilson & Stafford Ltd. The production of felt hats in the town ceased altogether with the closure of the Wilson & Stafford factory in 1999. As of 2018 the factory has received the go-ahead to be redeveloped into canalside residential apartments.

Governance
Atherstone is part of the parliamentary constituency of North Warwickshire. The current Member of Parliament (MP) for the area being Conservative's Craig Tracey. The local authority is North Warwickshire Borough Council, which, since May 2015, has been under Conservative control. As a civil parish, Atherstone also has a Town Council; Atherstone Town Council has 15 councillors representing three wards.

Geography

The village of Mancetter has become contiguous with Atherstone to the southeast, although it remains a separate civil parish. Atherstone is close to the River Anker which forms the boundary between Warwickshire and Leicestershire. The village of Witherley is located on the opposite bank of the river in neighbouring Leicestershire. Other nearby villages include Sheepy Magna, Ratcliffe Culey, Fenny Drayton, Grendon, Dordon, Baxterley, Baddesley Ensor and Hartshill. The town of Coleshill is to the southeast.

The A5 road (former Watling Street) historically ran through the town centre, but a dual carriageway bypass was opened in 1963.

Economy
In part due to its central location in the UK, Atherstone's economy has expanded rapidly since the 1980s, with several major companies such as  3M (1964) TNT (1987), Aldi (1990s) setting up their head office operations and/or national distribution centres in the town. The British Home Stores warehouse which had operated in the town for 40 years, closed in August 2016, It is now used by Royal Mail as a regional sorting office. Atherstone was formerly known for its hatting industry. The remains of the town's last hat manufacturing site on Coleshill Road are scheduled for demolition in 2022, after the local council decided it could not be safely redeveloped into canalside apartments.

Transport
Atherstone is on the main A5 national route and close to the M42 motorway.

The Coventry Canal and a series of eleven locks runs through the town, as does the West Coast Main Line railway. Atherstone has its railway station on this line, with an hourly service 7 days a week to both London and Crewe via Stafford. The current level of service was introduced in 2008, and is a big improvement on the service two decades earlier there were only five trains a day, just going between Stafford and Rugby.

The historic station building, built in 1847, was under threat of demolition in the early 1980s. Thanks to a local group, the Railway and Steam Traction Society, listed status was obtained, with the building celebrating its 150th anniversary in 1997. Building work won a special Ian Allan conservation award. As of 2008, the railway station building is occupied by a local veterinary practice.

Recreation
The major football team in the town is Atherstone Town, known as 'the Adders'. This is after the tradition which has Atherstone being a corruption of the name "Adders – stone". Their ground is located on Sheepy Road. 
Atherstone's team started out as Atherstone Town Football Club in 1887 but folded in 1979, from 1979 to 2003 Atherstone's football team was known as Atherstone United Football Club but folded again mid-season in 2003. The team then reverted to its previous name Atherstone Town Football Club. The club made the national headlines in October 2013 when during an FA Cup 3rd Qualifying round against Barrow A.F.C. crowd violence erupted during the first half when a small "minority" of Atherstone supporters ran across the pitch and attacked a number of Barrow supporters. The ringleaders and other participants of the crowd trouble were subsequently arrested, charged and sentenced to various jail terms. Since this incident the club has established itself as a family and community orientated club.

The rugby union team is Atherstone Rugby Football Club who play in the Warwickshire Two League. Their ground is situated on Ratcliffe Road. The same ground is shared by Atherstone Town Cricket Club, Atherstone Rangers Junior Football Club and is the home of Atherstone Adders Hockey Club, who play at the nearby Queen Elizabeth Academy.

Atherstone Leisure Complex is at the north end of Long Street and consists of a swimming pool and gym. Atherstone Memorial Hall is also part of the leisure complex.

Shrovetide Ball Game

An annual tradition in Atherstone is the Shrove Tuesday Ball Game played on a public highway with large crowds. The game celebrated its 800th anniversary in 1999.

The game is a complete free-for-all played along Watling Street (the old Roman road) at the point where it forms the main street of Atherstone town. The ball is decorated with red, white and blue ribbons that are exchanged for money by who ever is able to obtain one and is made of thick leather to make it too heavy to kick far. The match starts at 3:00pm when the ball is thrown from the window of Barclays Bank and continues until about 5:00pm. However the ball may legitimately be deflated or hidden after 4:30pm. There are no teams and no goals, though in the last century the match was played between a team from Warwickshire and one from Leicestershire. There is only one rule: players are not allowed to kill one another. Whoever is able to hang onto the ball at the end of the game not only wins the game but is allowed to keep the ball as well. The game is controlled by a number of "marshalls" some of whom are former winners. Police are present but for the two hours the game is in progress stand back and allow the action to continue. Legend has it that many an old feud is settled on Ball Game day. This Shrove Tuesday ball game has been held annually since the early 12th century and is one of Atherstone's claims to fame. The 2019 edition of the game was noted for being extremely violent with several videos of the event being uploaded to social media. Event organisers disputed the accounts of violence as "nothing new".

The origin of the game, in the reign of King John, is thought to have been a "Match of Gold that was played between the Warwickshire Lads and the Leicestershire Lads on Shrove Tuesday".

The 'ball' used is specially made each year and is 'thrown out' by a prominent sporting or show business personality. Shop windows are boarded-up and traffic is diverted on the afternoon whilst the game, in which hundreds of people take part, progresses along the town's main streets.

Naval connections
Atherstone has strong naval connections. Three Royal Navy ships have been named HMS Atherstone after the town: the vessels were commissioned in 1916, 1939, and most recently, 1985.

Education
Primary age schools in Atherstone include the Outwoods Primary School, the Racemeadow Primary Academy, and St Benedict's RC Primary Academy.

The Queen Elizabeth Academy is the state secondary school in the town.

Notable people

 Obadiah Grew (1607–1689) an English nonconformist minister 
 Abel Roper (1665–1726) an English journalist, who wrote in the Tory interest 
 William Stratford Dugdale DL (1800–1871) a British Tory politician & MP 
 William Yolland CB, FRS (1810–1885) an English military surveyor, astronomer and engineer and Britain's Chief Inspector of Railways 
 Prof Herbert R. Spencer FRCP (1860–1941) professor of obstetrics
 Sir John Bretland Farmer FRS, FRSE (1865–1944) a British botanist
 Charlie Wilson (1895–1971) an English footballer who played over 150 games for Stoke City 
 Arthur Johnson (1903–1987) an English professional footballer
 Rhoda Sutherland (1907–1989) an academic of the French language, Old French and Old Provençal
 Jack Barnes (1908–2008) an English pro footballer, also played for Atherstone Town F.C.
 Mary Fox (1922–2005) artist
 Bernard Hunt MBE (1930–2013) an English professional golfer
 Johnny Schofield (1931–2006) an English footballer who played as goalkeeper, later he ran an off-licence in Atherstone 
 Frank Upton (1934–2011) an English professional football player and manager. 
 Les Green (1941–2012) an English footballer and manager
 Bill Olner (1942–2020) a British Labour Party politician, MP for Nuneaton 1992–2010 
 Leigh Lawson (born 1945) a British film and stage actor, director and writer 
 Sara Thornton (born 1950's) local resident convicted and later acquitted of murdering her violent and alcoholic husband
 Andy Green OBE (born 1962) a British RAF fighter pilot and World Land Speed Record holder
 Paul Broadhurst (born 1965) an English professional golfer
 Steve Webster (born 1975) an English professional golfer.

See also
Atherstone on Stour, a village in Warwickshire
HMS Atherstone
Witherley

References

External links

 Atherstone Town Council
 Atherstone archives – Our Warwickshire

History links
Atherstone History : A comprehensive history of Atherstone and the surrounding area from the Romans up until the 20th century
Atherstone 16th-century inventories and map of the township printed in John Nichols' Antiquities of Leicestershire
Archdeaconry court case from Atherstone Fair with 18th-century Bracebridge estate map of the town showing the market square
1100s–2007 Atherstone Ball Game from Atherstone History

 
Traditional football
Market towns in Warwickshire
Towns in Warwickshire